Point Foundation  may refer to:

Point Foundation (environment)
Point Foundation (LGBT)